Enid Bell Palanchian (December 4, 1904 – 1994), known professionally as Enid Bell, was an American sculptor, illustrator and teacher born in London, England.

Early life
Bell studied at the Glasgow School of Art, then at the St John's Wood Art School as well as studying with fellow Scot Sir William Reid Dick in London and then after moving to the United States, at the Art Students League in New York City.  Essentially a figurative, direct carving in wood artist, she was based in New Jersey where she became the head of the sculpture program of the Federal Art Project for that state and was herself the creator of several FAP commissions.

In 1932 she married Armenian-American businessman and artist, Missalk Palanchian, though she retained her surname as Bell for professional purposes.

She taught at Miss Chaplin's School of Arts in New York City from 1929-1931 under the role of an art teacher.  In 1940 until 1941 she was the Sculpture Supervisor for the New Jersey Arts & Crafts Project, W.P.A.

Following the end of the Federal Art Project in 1944, she taught as instructor of sculpture and Head of the Sculpture Department of the Newark School of Fine and Industrial Art until 1968.

Bell was a member of the National Sculpture Society.

Bell died in 1994 in Englewood, New Jersey.

Exhibitions

Solo Exhibitions 

 Ferargil Galleries, New York City, December 9 – 29, 1929, exhibited 22 pieces including hazel wood “Pause”, Madonna”, “Trio” cherrywood “Duet” & “Harvesters”, bronze “Pavlova”, “Summer” & “Liza”, white oak “Negress”, whitewood “Negresses” & “Mexicans” and portrait panels and screens. 
 Arden Gallery, New York City, NY, November 5 - 19, 1934, exhibited 26 pieces including metal panels “Oriental Dancers”, “Flute Player” and unnamed “Two Figures”, a mahogany screen, ebony “Africans”, “Negress” & “Nocturne”, marble “Seated Figure”, “Sleep” & “Pigeons”, white pine “Mother and Child”, mahogany “Dancer”, Japanese wood “Cyclamen”, several carved chests, hazelwood “At the Window” and cherry wood “Harvesters” & “Composition”. 
 New Jersey Arts & Crafts Project, Works Project Administration, “Exhibition of Sculpture & Drawings by Enid Bell”, 1940
 Southern Connecticut State College, “Exhibition”, 1966
 North Jersey Cultural Council, “Exhibition”, May 1969
 Museum of Santa Fe, Santa Fe, New Mexico
 Illinois State Museum, Springfield, Illinois, February 15 to April 15,1957, Exhibited twenty sculptures including “Bathers”, “Clown”, and pieces of ballplayers and musicians.

Joint Exhibitions With Missak Palanchian 

 Kresge Gallery, Newark, NJ, 1934
 Museum of Santa Fe, Santa Fe, New Mexico, 1948
 Museum of New Mexico Art, Santa Fe, New Mexico, 1950
 Harwood Gallery, Taos, New Mexico
 Argent Gallery, New York City, New York, March 1949, Exhibited 24 pieces including, ebony “Dark Continent” and “Africans”, white marble “Embrace” & “Madonna”, terra-cotta “Odalisque” & “Clown”, pine “Sisters”, “Spirella”, “Baseball” & “Mother and Child” bronze “Dancers”, mahogany “Musician”, ”Boy”, “Orientale” & “Undula”, and pear wood “Bathers”.  
 Silo Gallery, Morris Plains, NJ, March 1954, exhibited pieces including ebony “Dark Continent”

Annual, Special, and Group Exhibitions 
Europe
 Paris International Exposition, Paris, France, 1937- Winner of the Gold Medal Award
New York
 Metropolitan Museum of Art, “Artists for Victory -  An Exhibition of Contemporary American Art”
 New York's First World Fair, “American Art Today”, 1939, exhibited marble “Mother and Child”
 Museum of the City of New York, “National Exhibition of American Art”, Summer 1938, Exhibited “Mother and Child”
 New York Society of Craftsmen, “44th Annual Exhibition”, March 19 – 29th, 1947
 Argent Gallery, New York City, NY, “Contemporary American Crafts”, March 27 through April 6, 1946
 Ferargil Galleries, New York City, “Exhibition”, Spring 1930, exhibited “Negress” and “Pavlova”
 Brooklyn Museum, “Recent Works by Distinguished Sculptors”, 1930, exhibited cherry wood “Duet”, walnut “Autumn” and white wood “Negress”
 Whitney Studio Club, New York City, 1930
 Chappaqua Gallery,  “Exhibit of Painting, Graphics and Sculptures”, September 28th to October, 1951
 Leslie Fliegel Gallery, “8 Contemporary Artists”, December 8, 1963 to January 12, 1964.
New Jersey
 New Jersey State Museum, Trenton, NJ 
 “Nature in Sculpture”, December 10, 1957 to February 2, 1958 
 “Art from New Jersey Colleges Exhibition”, January 8 to February 6, 1966, Enid Bell representing the Newark School of Fine and Industrial Arts, exhibited her white wood piece “Young Indian”
 The Jersey City Museum:
 “The Nellie Wright Allen Exhibition”, November 3 – 29th, 1947, Exhibited “Undula”
 “The Nellie Wright Allen Exhibition”, 1948, exhibited “Clown” and “Embrace”
 “20th Annual National Exhibition”, February 20 to March 18, 1961, exhibited “Seated Figure”
 Fifty-Sixth Street Galleries, Exhibition in Plainfield, NJ, February 1930, exhibited a panel of her sister, Jean Diack, to which the Art Digest gave honorable mention. 
 Ringwood Gallery, NJ, “Exhibition of Sculptures”, July 7 – 22nd, 1973
 Rutgers University, Douglas College, “Mary H. Dana Women Artists Series”, January 11 to February 19, 1988, exhibited 16 pieces, including Maplewood “Diver”, and “Mother and Child” and “Sisters”. 
 Trenton Museum, ”New Deal Art”
 Montclair Art Museum, NJ:
 “New Jersey State Exhibition”, November 12 to December 24th, 1948, Exhibited terra-cotta “Dancers”, Received First Sculpture Award
 “21st Annual New Jersey State Exhibition”, November _ to December 2, 1951, the awards jury withheld the top award in sculpture because of an exhibition rule that no artists may take the same prize within a five year period.  Awarded “Honorable Mention” for her white marble “Madonna” because she had received the first prize award less than 5 years previously.
 “The Awards Artists Exhibition”, March 1966, exhibited pieces including “Bird Bath”
 The Newark School of Fine and Industrial Art:
 “Annual Exhibition”, demonstration by Enid Bell, February 20, 1947
 “Annual Exhibition”, demonstration by Enid Bell, May 19, 1948
 “Annual Exhibition”, demonstration by Enid Bell, May 17, 1949
 Solo Exhibit January 22 to February 2, ?, Exhibited “Bathers”, Composition”, “African”, “Mother and Child”, Grief”, “Night”, “Pieta”, Pigeons”, Pavlova”, “Night Club”, “Whitewood Screen”, “Dancers”, “Negress”, “Musicians”, and  “Hazelwood Panel”.
 “Annual Exhibition”, demonstration in clay by Enid Bell, May 1964
 Newark Public Library, “A History of Crafts”, Summer 1968
 The Newark Art Club, “American Art Week Exhibition”, October 30 to November 20, 1947, Exhibited “Pony Rider” and “Mother and Child”
 Associated Artists of New Jersey:
 “Third New York Exhibition” at the Riverside Museum, March 2 – 23rd, 1947, Exhibited “Clown”, “Sisters”, “Bathers” and “Refugees”;
 “Exhibition” at Summit Art Association, April 25 to May 9, 1948, Exhibited “Boy Reading”, “Surf Rider” and “Spanish Mother”
 “Exhibition” at the Newark Museum, March 26 to April 24, 1949, Exhibited terra-cotta “Indian Mother”
 “Work by New Jersey Artists”, March 25 to April 30, 1952
 “Exhibition” at the Newark Public Library, November 1953
 “Seventh New York Exhibition”, November 6 – 24, 1954, exhibited mahogany “Tackle” and “Violinist”
 “Newark Arts Festival”, June 1 – 7, 1959, exhibited “Odalisque”
 Leonia Public Library, NJ
 “Exhibition”, May 1977, exhibited 20 pieces
 “Sculptures and Craft Illustrations”, March 1983, exhibited pieces included mahogany relief “Madonna”

Pennsylvania

 The Pennsylvania Academy of the Fine Arts:
 “Annual Exhibition of Painting and Sculpture”, January 28 to March 3, 1940, exhibited “Mother and Child”
 “Annual Exhibition of Painting and Sculpture”, January 26 to March 3, 1946, Exhibited “Sisters”, January 26 to March 2, 1947, Exhibited “Dark Continent”
Florida
 Miami Beach Art Center, “Exhibition” March _ to April 5, 1949, Exhibited 6 pieces including pearwood “Bathers”

New Mexico

 New Mexico State Fair, 1949

Kansas

 Wichita Art Association, “Decorative Arts – Ceramic Exhibition”, May 4-11, 1946, Exhibited ceramic pieces, “Angel”, “Girl Reading” and “Bathers”

Georgia

 Columbus Museum, “Exhibition”, October 1956, exhibited pieces including terra-cotta “Grief” and mahogany “Violinist”

Illinois

 Illinois Museum, “Art Gallery Exhibit”, February 15 to April 15, 1957, exhibited pieces including “Bathers”, “Baseball”, “Musicians”, and “Clown”

National

 National Academy of Design, unknown year
 National Sculpture Society:
 “An Exhibition of Sculpture”, May 14 to June 20, 1952, Exhibited “Embrace” and “Clown”
 “Sculpture Exhibition 1961”, April 4 – 21, 1961, exhibited “Native”
 “16th Annual Exhibition”, May 1969, Exhibited “At the Window” which won a special honorable mention
 Architectural League, unknown year
 Dance International, unknown year
 Audubon Artists, 1945

Awards 

 Sculpture Medal, Newark Art Club, Newark, NJ, 1933
 Gold Medal, Paris International Exposition, Paris, France, 1937
 First Honor for Wood Sculpture, New Mexico State Fair, Santa Fe, New Mexico, 1941
 Second Honor for Ceramics, New Mexico State Fair, Santa Fe, New Mexico, 1941
 Honorary Membership of the Eugene Field Society National Association of Authors and Journalists, awarded March 19, 1941
 First-Place Award in Sculpture, Annual New Jersey State Exhibition, Montclair Museum, Montclair, NJ, 1948
 Nellie Wright Allen Award, Jersey City Museum Exposition

Work

 Birds, Leonia Public Library, Leonia, New Jersey (installed 1981)
 untitled, Boonton Post Office, Boonton, New Jersey, (1938)
 Boonton Post Office, Boonton, New Jersey
 Children Reading, Union City Public Library, Union City, New Jersey (circa 1936-1939)
 Colonizing America, Center for Youth Education, Newark, New Jersey  (1934)
 First Sisters Arriving at Port of Newark, Wooden Panel (1937)
 Little Indian Dancer, Englewood Public Library, Englewood, New Jersey
 Alexander Hamilton, Troy Public Library, Troy, New York
 bird bath, Music, Science, Union City Library, Union City, New Jersey
 The Post Office 1790, United States Post Office, Mt. Holly, New Jersey (1937)
 On the Range, Deaf Smith County Museum, Hereford, Texas (1941)
 On the Range, Smithsonian American Art Museum (1941)
 Untitled Sculptural Frieze, Heckscher Museum of Art, Huntington, New York
 Tackle, Private collection, 1950
 5 Arts and Crafts "Filmstrips" Series, published by Encyclopedia Brittanica, 1954
 "Tin Craft as a Hobby", Harper Brother Publishers, 1934, favorably reviewed by the World Telegram and N.Y. Times in 1934
 "Practical Woodcarving Projects", Harper Brothers Publishers, 1940
 "Signs and Symbols in Christian Art", Oxford University Press (Illustrator only)
 "Christian Symbols in Italian Art", MacMillan Publishers (Illustrator only)
 "Forsaking All Others", Alice Duer Miller, Simon and Schuster Publishers, 1931, illustrations only, drawings of N.Y. scenes
 Various Articles in National Sculpture Review
 Various Articles in American Artist Magazine, including March 1965, "My Wood Sculpture" & June 1968, "Sculptors Hartwig & Glinsky"

References

1904 births
1994 deaths
American women sculptors
20th-century American sculptors
Treasury Relief Art Project artists
National Sculpture Society members
20th-century American women artists
Artists from London
Sculptors from New Jersey
Alumni of the Glasgow School of Art
Alumni of St John's Wood Art School
Art Students League of New York alumni
English emigrants to the United States
Sculptors from New York (state)
Federal Art Project artists